Straume or Hyen is a village in Gloppen Municipality in Vestland, Norway. The village lies near the southern end of the Hyefjorden near the mouths of the rivers Åelva and Hopelva. Hyen Church is located in Straume, serving the whole western part of Gloppen municipality.

There are around 600 people living in the Hyen area.  The village lies along Norwegian County Road 615 which connects the whole Hyen valley to the municipal center of Sandane to the east and to the village of Eikefjord (in Flora Municipality) to the west.  Continuing on from Eikefjord, one can reach the towns of Førde and Florø which are both located along Norwegian National Road 5.

The nearby river Åelva is a very good salmon river.  The successful shipyard Brødrene Aa lies on the outskirts of the village of Straume.  Brødrene Aa develops and produces products in reinforced plastics like: protective guards, train fronts and express boats.

References

Villages in Vestland
Gloppen